The following lists events that happened during 2012 in Cambodia.

Incumbents 
 Monarch: Norodom Sihamoni 
 Prime Minister: Hun Sen

Events

February
 February 3 - The Extraordinary Chambers in the Courts of Cambodia increases the sentence of Kang Kek Iew, or Duch, to life for running the Tuol Sleng prison camp under the Khmer Rouge.

March
 March 19 - Swiss Judge Laurent Kasper-Ansermet resigns from the international war crimes tribunal in Cambodia.

May
 May 16 - Cambodian police and soldiers clash with villagers after attempting to evict them from their land, where a Russian plantation project is to be headquartered. A teenage girl has reportedly been killed.

July
 July 8 - Cambodian health officials identify Enterovirus 71 as a possible cause for an outbreak in which at least 64 children have died.
 July 13 - Cambodian troops aim machine gun fire at a Thai passenger jet, saying they believed it to be a spy plane, but do not hit the plane.

September
 September 2 - Police in Cambodia announce that Gottfrid Svartholm Warg, one of the founders of The Pirate Bay, was arrested on August 30 in Phnom Penh, enforcing a suspected Interpol warrant by his homeland Sweden. Warg has been sentenced in April 2012 by a court in Stockholm for copyright violations to 12 months in jail and his quarter share (about € 900,000) in a solidary fine of 30 million SKr.
 September 4 - Police in Cambodia say The Pirate Bay co-founder Gottfrid Svartholm, who was arrested on Sunday, "is to be deported", saying it's up to Sweden to decide where and not specifying when. There is no extradition agreement between the two countries.
 September 12 - A Cambodian journalist is found murdered in the boot of his car, after reporting on illegal logging.

October
 October 15 - Former King of Cambodia Norodom Sihanouk dies in Beijing, China, at the age of 89.
 October 17 - The body of former King Norodom Sihanouk is returned to Cambodia.

December
 December 8 - Eight people, including four children, are killed after fire rages through a popular night market in Siem Reap.

Deaths
 October 15 - Norodom Sihanouk

References

 
Years of the 21st century in Cambodia
Cambodia
2010s in Cambodia
Cambodia